Ala Modalaindi is a 2011 Indian Telugu-language romantic comedy film written and directed by B. V. Nandini Reddy under the Sri Ranjith Movies banner. It stars Nani, Nithya Menen (in her Telugu debut) and Sneha Ullal with the music composed by Kalyani Malik. The film's cinematography is performed by Arjun Jena with editing by Marthand K. Venkatesh.

Released on 21 January 2011, the film opened to favorable reviews by critics and became a commercial success. The film grossed 15 crore on a budget of 4 crore. Reddy won the Nandi Award for Best First Film of a Director SIIMA Award for Best Debut Director – Telugu. The film is considered one of the "25 Greatest Telugu Films Of The Decade" by Film Companion. The film is remade in Tamil as Yennamo Yedho (2014), in Bengali as Olpo Olpo Premer Golpo (2014) and in Kannada as Bhale Jodi (2016).

Plot
The film begins with an accident. Gautham is abducted by John Abraham. On the way, Gautham is forced to narrate his tale as he talks of stopping a marriage and John too talks of preventing a wedding. Hence, the flashback. Gautham is ready to propose to Simran with a bunch of roses, but destiny has other plans. Elsewhere, Nithya is playing cricket and hits Gautham with her shot. He is then taken to the hospital in the stretcher. Simran falls in love with Dr. Anand, who was treating Gautham and they get married eventually. Gautham is invited and leaves for the wedding, but cannot face Simran. When he walks out, he gets drunk and meets a drunk Nithya who actually was in love with Anand. They go around freaking during the night and part ways the next day.

As destiny has it, they happen to meet in a pub after a few days. Gautham accompanies her everywhere. He realises he's in love with her, but before he could tell her, he finds out that she is already engaged. Gautham steps back and stays secluded. Nithya and her fiancé end their engagement over an argument about Gautham. Unaware of this and having moved on, Gautham starts dating a veterinary doctor Kavya, but they break up after an altercation. Nithya realizes that she loves Gautam and goes to his house after his mother dies, to propose to him, but is shocked to see Kavya in his house. Thinking that they both are married, she leaves to Bangalore and accepts the marriage proposal her parents set for her. After realizing Nithya misunderstood him, Gautham and his friends leave for Bangalore to stop the marriage.

On the way to Bangalore, their car stops and Gautam asks for a lift and they accept and that is where he was kidnapped. After a big fight between Gautam and John Abraham, it is revealed that John Abraham was looking for the one who gave Gautam a lift, not Gautam. He helps Gautam to reach the wedding. Gautam's friends, who reach the wedding hall, reveal the truth to Nithya. In order to meet Gautham, Nithya escapes from the wedding and ends up asking John Abraham for a lift, who accepts looking at the jewellery she is wearing. After listening to her, John realizes that she is Nithya that Gautham came for. He drives back the car to the wedding hall and Nithya take the gun and kidnaps Gautam. Then after a comical scuffle, Nithya reunites with Gautham.

Cast

 Nani as Gautam
 Nithya Menen as Nithya
 Sneha Ullal as Kavya
 Ashish Vidyarthi as John Abraham
 Rohini as Revathi, Gautam's mother
 Chaitanya Krishna as Deepak, Nithya's fiancé
 Thagubothu Ramesh as Gautham
 Pragathi as Nithya's mother
 Sivannarayana Naripeddi as Sivannarayana, Nithya's uncle
 Mirchi Hemanth as Gautham's friend
 Snigdha as Pinky
 Praveen as Rowdy
 Dhanraj as Rowdy
 Chanti as Rowdy
 Nandini Reddy as Pinky's neighbour (cameo)
 Kriti Kharbanda as Simran (cameo)

Release
The film was released on 21 January 2011.

Dubbed versions 
The film's Malayalam dubbed version, titled Angane Thudangi, is released in Kerala on 28 July 2011. The film got a wide release. Angane Thudangi was the first Malayalam film (though dubbed) to be made available for online viewing on the same day as its release. This arrangement was made by Mathrubhumi, who also released the music for the Malayalam version.  The home video of Angane Thudangi was released by Hot & Sour on 2 December 2011.

Reception
Rediff gave a four star rating, stating "All in all Ala Modalaindi is a fun ride" explaining "Nani and Nithya are at their natural best. Both are so effortless and at ease and share a great chemistry. They are expressive in a range of emotions too."

Sify also gave a 4/5 star rating, noting "Nandini Reddy's plot is simple but her screenplay is knitted with many twists and turns and that makes the movie a pleasant watch. Nani and Nithya Menen score in performance."

Review sites IdleBrain and GreatAndhra, which also gave 4 ratings, praised the lead pair's performance.

The film ran for 100 days theatrically.

Soundtrack
Kalyani Malik has composed the songs and soundtrack for the film.

Telugu original soundtrack

Malayalam dubbed soundtrack
The music for the Malayalam version was composed by Jassie Gift, based on the tunes in the original film. The lyrics for Angane Thudangi were written by Siju Thuravoor.

Awards and nominations

References

External links
 

2011 films
Telugu films remade in other languages
Indian romantic comedy films
2011 directorial debut films
Films directed by B. V. Nandini Reddy
2010s Telugu-language films